, (Miyako: Sїmuzї) was a town located in Miyako District, Okinawa Prefecture, Japan.

As of 2003, the town had an estimated population of 3,200 and a density of 135.25 per km2. The total area was 23.66 km2.

On October 1, 2005, Shimoji, along with the city of Hirara, and the towns of Gusukube and Irabu, and the village of Ueno (all from Miyako District), was merged to create the city of Miyakojima.

Dissolved municipalities of Okinawa Prefecture